Bobet Vidanes (born October 11, 1965) is a Filipino television director and politician who currently serves as a municipal councilor of Pililla, Rizal since 2022. As director, he is known for his works such as It's Showtime and Pilipinas, Game KNB?. He was also an actor for It's Showtime Holy Week Drama Specials during Holy Week of every year from 2013 to 2019. He is also the director of the Philippine adaptation of the Got Talent franchise, Pilipinas Got Talent, and also the director of the idol franchise of Idol Philippines.

Personal life
Vidanes was married to Cory Vidanes, the chief operating officer for broadcast of ABS-CBN Corporation. They have three children, Kobi, Ara, and Chad.

Career
Vidanes is a director of many ABS-CBN shows. Vidanes created and directed Pilipinas, Game KNB?, a long-running game show in the Philippines airing from 2001 to 2009. He also directed Kapamilya, Deal or No Deal, the Philippine adaptation of the Deal or No Deal franchise.

In 2005, Vidanes also co-directed a musical comedy variety show Wowowee with co-director Johnny "Mr. M." Manahan.

In 2009, Vidanes created the variety show It's Showtime wherein it became commercially successful for it garnered high audience shares during its debut. During the show's run, Vidanes had an issue with one of the show's host, Vice Ganda wherein there was a hint that Vidanes might resign from the show. However, both Vidanes and Vice Ganda denied their conflict and also Vidanes' resignation.

In 2010, Vidanes directed the Philippine version of the Got Talent entitled as Pilipinas Got Talent.

In 2016, Bobet is also recently as a new actor for For The Win an It's Showtime Holy Week Drama Specials 2016 which he play a basketball coach.

In 2017, Bobet returns as an actor for an It's Showtime Holy Week Drama Specials 2017 this time, which he play a tricycle driver for Anne Curtis for Anne's role as a Guardian Angel.

In 2019, Vidanes directed the Philippine version of the Idols entitled as Idol Philippines.

In 2020, Vidanes resigned as director of It's Showtime after 11 years and was replaced by Boyet Baldemor as the new director of the show.

In 2021, following his departure from It's Showtime, Vidanes moved to Viva Entertainment and directed The Wall Philippines and 1000 Heartbeats: Pintig Pinoy. He would later become one of the main directors of the Brightlight Productions-produced show Lunch Out Loud.

Filmography

Television (Directing)

Television (Acting)

Film

References

External links
 

1965 births
Living people
ABS-CBN people
Filipino television directors
PDP–Laban politicians
Filipino city and municipal councilors
People from Rizal